German football clubs hold the third place in UEFA ranking and are represented by four clubs in the UEFA Champions League, two clubs in the UEFA Europa League and one club in the UEFA Europa Conference League. Over the last few years German football has risen, and that can be confirmed from the appearance of two German clubs in the final of the 2012–13 Champions League. German football has won interest in all of Europe because the majority of associations are financially healthy and the number of spectators in stadiums has been rising.

During the first years of European competitions, Germany was divided into West and East Germany, so initially German football was represented by two countries and two different championships, the Bundesliga and the DDR-Oberliga. After the German reunification in October 1990, the Bundesliga became the league for all of Germany. West German football clubs have entered European association football competitions since the 1955–56 season, when Rot-Weiss Essen took part in European Cup competition. East German football clubs entered European association football competitions two years later, since the 1957–58 season, when FC Erzgebirge Aue took part in European Cup competition. 

So far, German clubs have won the Champions League/European Cup eight times (Bayern, Dortmund and Hamburg), the Europa League/UEFA Cup seven times (Mönchengladbach, Bayern, Eintracht Frankfurt, Leverkusen, Schalke), the UEFA Cup Winners' Cup five times (Bayern, Bremen, Dortmund, Hamburg, Magdeburg), the UEFA Super Cup twice (Bayern) and the UEFA Intertoto Cup nine times (Karlsruhe, Schalke, Stuttgart, Bremen, Hamburg and Hertha).

Finals and cups

Champions League / European Cup

Europa League / UEFA Cup

UEFA Cup Winners' Cup

European Super Cup / UEFA Super Cup

Worldwide competitions

Intercontinental Cup

FIFA Club World Cup

Full European record

UEFA Champions League/European Cup
After German reunification

UEFA Europa League/UEFA Cup
After German reunification

UEFA Europa Conference League

Notes
Stuttgart would have won on away goals; however, it was realised that in the second leg between Leeds United and Stuttgart, Stuttgart had substituted a fourth foreign player. At the time, a maximum of three foreign players was allowed. The game was awarded to Leeds United with a score of 3–0, making it 3–3 on aggregate with no difference in away goals. A play-off match in Barcelona was ordered, which Leeds United won 2–1.

References

External links
rsssf German Clubs In European Cups

 
European football clubs in international competitions